Species360 (formerly International Species Information System or ISIS) founded in 1974, is an international non-profit organization that maintains an online database of wild animals under human care. , the organization serves more than 1,000 zoos, aquariums and zoological associations in 90 countries worldwide. The organization provides its members with zoological data collection and management software called ZIMS—the Zoological Information Management System.

ZIMS project was a large global collaboration with 600 people contributing under the leadership of Nate Flesness, Executive Director of Species360 (1979–2009), and Hassan Syed, CIO of Species360 (2003–2010). The ZIMS database contains information on 22,000 species, 10 million animals, and 82 million medical records. Members use the basic biologic information (age, sex, parentage, place of birth, circumstance of death, etc.) collected in the system to care for and manage their animal collections (including demographic and genetic management in many cases). It is also used for ex situ breeding programs and supporting conservation research and programs.

Since its foundation in 1973, the group has been a Non-Governmental Organization (NGO) pursuing wild animal conservation goals. Species360 works in partnership with zoo associations around the world.

Centralized database
Modern zoos and aquariums often are "gene banks" for endangered species. In some cases, species which have become extinct in the wild and have been bred in zoos are eventually returned to the wild. Examples include the black-footed ferret, California condor, Przewalski's horse, red wolf, Micronesian kingfisher (not yet reintroduced), and the Arabian oryx. Individual zoos generally do not have the space to maintain a viable species population (which for many mammals and birds requires 500+ animals in order to maintain sufficient genetic diversity), so maintaining genetic diversity requires coordination between many zoos. Scientific expertise on husbandry, nutrition, veterinary care and so on is spread throughout the zoos and aquaria of the world. Breeding and population management relies on accurate information about animals in all member institutions, especially pedigree history (parentage) and demography (births and deaths).

Species360 records are accepted by international regulatory bodies such as CITES.  Roughly three-quarters of Association of Zoos and Aquariums (AZA) members in North America are members, and the European Association of Zoos and Aquaria (EAZA) requires its members to join. The World Association of Zoos and Aquaria's (WAZA) Conservation Strategy Guidelines strongly recommend that all zoo and aquaria join and participate in data sharing via ZIMS.

Software
 ZIMS (Zoological Information Management System) for Husbandry A web-based record-keeping system used by zoos, aquariums, and zoological associations to capture and organize husbandry information. also includes best practices and collaboration opportunities among members.

 ZIMS for Medical A web-based module used to capture and organize:  A web-based record-keeping system used by zoos, aquariums, and zoological associations to capture and organize veterinary information.

 ZIMS for Studbooks A web-based record-keeping system used by studbook keepers at zoos, aquariums, and zoological associations to manage the genetics of small populations. This tool is managing over 1300 species studbooks globally and replaced SPARKS, the DOS-based Single Population Analysis and Records Keeping System.  

The ZIMS application is the world's first and only real-time, unified global database for animals in zoos and aquariums.

 LearnZIMS – the educational version of ZIMS is made available for licensing to educational organizations teaching animal husbandry, zoo, and aquarium science.  This version of ZIMS mirrors the standard ZIMS application but does not include the global database of animal records.  LearnZIMS uses a fictitious dataset to teach application functionality and to demonstrate the types of data that are collected in the global database.

Members 
Regional association members include:
 Arabian Zoo and Aquarium Association (AZAA)
 Asociación Colombiana de Parques Zoológicos y Acuarios (ACOPAZOA)
 Asociación de Zoológicos Criaderos y Acuarios de México (AZCARM)
 Asociación Ecuatoriana de Zoológicos y Acuarios
 Asociación Latinoamericana de Parques Zoológicos y Acuarios (ALPZA)
 Asociación Mesoamericana y del Caribe de Zoológicos y Acuarios (AMAZOO)
 Asociación Venezolana de Parques Zoológicos y Acuarios (AVZA)
 Association Française des Parcs Zoologiques (AFdPZ)
 Association of Zoos & Aquariums (AZA)
 British and Irish Association of Zoos and Aquariums (BIAZA)
 Canadian Accredited Zoos and Aquariums (CAZA)
 Central Zoo Authority of India (CZA)
 Danish Association for Zool Gardens and Aquaria (DAZA)
 Eurasian Regional Association of Zoos & Aquariums
 European Association of Zoos & Aquaria (EAZA)
 Florida Association of Zoos and Aquariums
 Iberian Association of Zoos & Aquaria (AIZA)
 Israel Nature & Parks Authority
 Israeli Zoo Association
 Japanese Association of Zoos and Aquariums (JAZA)
 Korean Association of Zoos and Aquariums (KAZA)
 Malaysian Association of Zoological Parks & Aquaria (MAZPA)
 Nederlandse Vereniging van Dierentuinen (NVD)
 Pan-African Association of Zoos and Aquaria
 Perhimpunan Kebun Binatang - Indonesian Zoo & Aquarium Association (PKBSI)
 Polish Association of Directors of Zoos & Aquaria (PZDA)
 Romanian Zoo & Aquarium Federation (RZAF)
 Sociedade de Zoologicos e Aquarios do Brasil (SZB)
 South-East Asia Zoos Association (SEAZA)
 Swedish Association of Zoos & Aquaria (SAZA)
 Thai Zoological Park Organization Under The Royal Patronage of HM The King (ZPO)
 Ukrainian Association of Zoos & Aquariums
 Unione Italiana Giardini Zoologici e Acquari (UIZA)
 Verband der Zoologischen Gärten (VdZ) e.V.
 Wildlife Institute of India
 Zoo Aquarium Association (ARAZPA Inc) (ZAA)
 Zoological Association of America
Species360 and the Central Zoo Authority of India (CZA) have a five-year memorandum of understanding with a primary goal of migrating the majority of the zoos in India into the ZIMS database.

The organization has staff and representatives in Amsterdam (the Netherlands), New Delhi (India), Jerusalem (Israel), Odense (Denmark), and Istanbul (Turkey) with headquarters in Minnesota (US).

History
In 1973, Ulysses Seal and Dale Makey proposed the International Species Information System (ISIS) as an international database to help zoos and aquariums accomplish long-term conservation management goals. It was founded in 1974 with an initial membership of 51 zoos in North America and Europe, and its membership has increased every year since. Grants and endorsements were provided by the Association of Zoos and Aquariums (AZA), the American Association of Zoo Veterinarians (AAZV) and other zoological associations. The founders also raised development funding from private foundations and the United States Department of the Interior. For the first 30 years, the Minnesota Zoo hosted the program on their grounds.

Since 1989, the organisation has been incorporated as a non-profit entity under an international Board of Trustees elected by subscribing member institutions. In 2016, the organization was renamed as Species360, due to ISIS being an acronym for the Islamic State of Iraq and Syria, a terrorist organization.

See also 
 List of zoo associations

References

External links

International environmental organizations
Zoology organizations